Walter Civitareale (born 2 August 1954) is a Luxembourgish pianist and composer. He is a professor of piano at the Conservatoire de la Ville de Luxembourg. He performed in the 2005 concert commemorating the 60th anniversary of the liberation of Luxembourg.

Works 
 Oratorio pour les exclus, homage to Abbé Pierre
 3 Bagatelles
 Concerto pour violoncelle et orchestre 
 Elegie und Liebeslied
 Concert pour violoncelle et orchestre, homage to 
 Concerto Humoristique

References

1954 births
Living people
21st-century pianists
Luxembourgian composers
Luxembourgian pianists